Stanislav Svoboda (1919–1992) was an international speedway rider from Czechoslovakia.

Speedway career 
Svoboda reached the final of the Speedway World Team Cup in the 1961 Speedway World Team Cup. He was twice a Continental Speedway Finalist in 1959 and 1960.

World final appearances

World Team Cup
 1961 -  Wrocław, Olympic Stadium (with Antonín Kasper Sr. / Bohumír Bartoněk / Luboš Tomíček Sr.) - 4th - 1pts (0)

References 

1919 births
1992 deaths
Czechoslovak speedway riders